Theoderich (or Theoderich von Treyden) (died 15 June 1219) was the second known missionary in Livonia after Saint Meinhard, the first Bishop of Livonia. He was previously a Cistercian monk working as a priest in Turaida (1191–1202), the first abbot of Daugavgrīva monastery (1202–1211), and appointed Bishop of Estonia during 1211–1219 by Albert of Buxhoeveden, the Bishop of Riga. He had apparently worked in missionary activities in Estonia already in 1191.

Theoderich was killed by Estonians at the Battle of Lyndanisse. After his death, the title "Bishop of Estonia" was no longer used, being temporarily replaced by the "Bishop of Leal" before the Estonian territory was divided into several dioceses.

What little is known about Theoderich's life, is recorded in several contemporary documents and the Chronicle of Henry of Livonia.

See also

 Fulco, Bishop of Estonia

External links 
  by the Estonian Institute.

1219 deaths
13th-century Roman Catholic bishops in Livonia
People of medieval Estonia
Christians of the Livonian Crusade
Year of birth unknown
12th-century births